Solovki Airport  is an airport in Russia on the Solovetsky Islands. It is believed to have had a minor Russian Navy presence but primarily serves as an airport for the island.

It appeared as a feature in the November/December 2016 issue of Airports of the World.

Airlines and destinations

It has been reported the Arkhangelsk-Solovki route is no longer operated by Smartavia in 2019.

References

Russian Navy
Airports built in the Soviet Union
Airports in Arkhangelsk Oblast